Colin Dibley and Sandy Mayer were the defending champions but only Dibley competed that year with Haroon Rahim.

Dibley and Rahim lost in the first round to Robert Lutz and Stan Smith.

Bob Hewitt and Frew McMillan won in the final 7–6, 7–6 against Marty Riessen and Roscoe Tanner.

Seeds

Draw

Final

Top half

Bottom half

References
 1977 American Airlines Tennis Games Doubles Draw

American Airlines Tennis Games Doubles